Sophia of Brandenburg (1300–1356) was a daughter of Margrave Henry I (1256–1318) and his wife Agnes of Bavaria (1276–1345).

In 1327, she married Duke Magnus "the Pious" of Brunswick-Wolfenbüttel (1304–1369), Duke of Brunswick-Lüneburg.  The following children reached adulthood:
 Magnus with the Necklace, Duke of Brunswick-Lüneburg (1324–1373), married Catherine, daughter of Bernhard III, Prince of Anhalt-Bernburg. They had more than ten children, some dukes of Brunswick-Lüneburg. Also Catherine Elisabeth of Brunswick-Lüneburg, grandmother of Christian I of Denmark.   
 Louis (died 1367)
 Albert, Prince-Archbishop of Bremen (died 1395)
 Henry, Provost of Halberstadt Cathedral 
 Ernest
 Matilda (d.a. 1354), married Bernhard III, Prince of Anhalt-Bernburg (d. 1348). They had two known children: 
 Otto III, Prince of Anhalt-Bernburg 
 Gertrude, married to Günther XII, Count of Schwarzburg.
 Agnes (1343–1404), married in c. 1360 to Count Heinrich/Henry of Hohnstein (de) (d. 1408). They had about six children, two counts of Hohnstein.
 Sophie (c. 1340 –  c. 1394), married in c. 1360 to Count Dietrich V of Hohnstein (c. 1306 – 1379), cousin of Heinrich, sharing their county and lordships. She was Dietrich's second (possibly third) wife, and in addition to his other children she bore him one daughter:
 Agnes (1360–1404), married 1377 to Christian V, Count of Oldenburg-Welsburg (c. 1342 – a. 1399). One of their sons, Dietrich, Count of Oldenburg, was father of Christian I of Denmark, Norway and Sweden, an ancestor of many Danish kings.

1300 births
1356 deaths
House of Ascania
German duchesses
14th-century German nobility
Duchesses of Brunswick-Lüneburg
14th-century German women
Daughters of monarchs